Síthmaith (or Síomha) is an Irish-language feminine name derived .

The name Síthmaith was used in early medieval Ireland. Síthmaith of Clonboreann (died 771) was an attested bearer of the name. It translates as good spirit.

See also
List of Irish-language given names
Irish language revivalism

References

 http://www.medievalscotland.org/kmo/AnnalsIndex/Feminine/Sithmaith.shtml

Irish-language feminine given names